Héron is a municipality of Wallonia located in the province of Liège, Belgium.

Geography
Héron is located on the river Mehaigne.

The municipality consists of the following districts: Couthuin, Héron, Lavoir, and Waret-l'Évêque.

Demography
On 1 January 2006 Héron had a total population of 4,534. The total area is 38.32 km2 which gives a population density of 118 inhabitants per km2.

Facilities
Héron is home to Couthuin Airport.

Gallery

References

External links
 

 
Municipalities of Liège Province